Javier Molina-Peiro (born 14 March 1970) is a Spanish former professional tennis player.

A right-handed player from Zaragoza, Molina turned professional in 1991. 

His only ATP Tour main draw appearance came as a qualifier at the 1992 Estoril Open, where he reached the second round with a win over Ronald Agenor. He lost his second round match to Ivan Lendl in three sets, having won the first.

References

External links
 
 

1970 births
Living people
Spanish male tennis players
Sportspeople from Zaragoza